Polyphylla avittata, known generally as the spotted Warner valley dunes June beetle or spotted Warner valley dunes scarab beetle, is a species of scarab beetle in the family Scarabaeidae. It is found in North America.

References

Further reading

 
 

Polyphylla
Articles created by Qbugbot
Beetles described in 1978